Cancer prevention is the practice of taking active measures to decrease the incidence of cancer and mortality. The practice of prevention is dependent upon both individual efforts to improve lifestyle and seek preventive screening, and socioeconomic or public policy related to cancer prevention. Globalized cancer prevention is regarded as a critical objective due to its applicability to large populations, reducing long term effects of cancer by promoting proactive health practices and behaviors, and its perceived cost-effectiveness and viability for all socioeconomic classes.

The majority of cancer cases are due to the accumulation of environmental pollution being inherited as epigenetic damage and many, but not all, of these environmental factors are controllable lifestyle choices. Greater than a reported 75% of cancer deaths could be prevented by avoiding risk factors including: tobacco, overweight / obesity, an insufficient diet, physical inactivity, alcohol, sexually transmitted infections, and air pollution. Not all environmental causes are controllable, such as naturally occurring background radiation, and other cases of cancer are caused through hereditary genetic disorders. Current gene editing techniques under development may serve as preventive measures in the future. Future preventive screening measures can be additionally improved by minimizing invasiveness and increasing specificity by taking individual biologic make up into account, also known as "population-based personalized cancer screening."

Focuses 

While anyone can get cancer, age is one of the biggest factors that can make a person more likely to get cancer: 3 out of 4 cancers are found in people aged 55 or older.

Dietary

While many dietary recommendations have been proposed to reduce the risk of cancer, the evidence to support them is not definitive. The primary dietary factors that increase risk are obesity and alcohol consumption; with a diet low in fruits and vegetables and high in red meat being implicated but not confirmed. A 2014 meta-analysis did not find a relationship between fruits and vegetables and cancer. Consumption of coffee is associated with a reduced risk of liver cancer. Studies have linked excessive consumption of red or processed meat to an increased risk of breast cancer, colon cancer, and pancreatic cancer, a phenomenon which could be due to the presence of carcinogens in meats cooked at high temperatures. Dietary recommendations for cancer prevention typically include an emphasis on vegetables, fruit, whole grains, and fish, and an avoidance of processed and red meat (beef, pork, lamb), animal fats, and refined carbohydrates.

Physical activity 
Research shows that regular physical activity helps to reduce up to 30% the risk of a variety of cancer types, such as colon cancer, breast cancer, lung cancer and endometrium cancer. The biological mechanisms underlying this association are still not well understood but different biological pathways involved in cancer have been studied suggesting that physical activity reduces cancer risk by helping weight control, reducing hormones such as estrogen and insulin, reducing inflammation and strengthening the immune system.

Medication and supplements
The concept that medications can be used to prevent cancer is attractive, and evidence supports their use in a few defined circumstances. In the general population, NSAIDs reduce the risk of colorectal cancer however due to the cardiovascular and gastrointestinal side effects they cause overall harm when used for prevention. Aspirin has been found to reduce the risk of death from cancer by about 7%. COX-2 inhibitor may decrease the rate of polyp formation in people with familial adenomatous polyposis however are associated with the same adverse effects as NSAIDs. Daily use of tamoxifen or raloxifene has been demonstrated to reduce the risk of developing breast cancer in high-risk women. The benefit verses harm for 5-alpha-reductase inhibitor such as finasteride is not clear. A study showing a proof-of-principle has also been done with the human proteins IFNalpha2a and macrophage-CSF, produced by genetically modified hens.

Vitamins have not been found to be effective at preventing cancer, although low blood levels of vitamin D are correlated with increased cancer risk. Whether this relationship is causal and vitamin D supplementation is protective is not determined. Beta-Carotene supplementation has been found to increase lung cancer rates in those who are high risk. Folic acid supplementation has not been found effective in preventing colon cancer and may increase colon polyps. A 2018 systematic review concluded that selenium has no beneficial effect in reducing the risk of cancer based on high quality evidence.

Vaccination
Anti-cancer vaccines can be preventive / prophylactic or be used as therapeutic treatment. All such vaccines incite adaptive immunity by enhancing cytotoxic T lymphocyte (CTL) recognition and activity against tumor-associated or tumor-specific antigens (TAA and TSAs).

Vaccines have been developed that prevent infection by some carcinogenic viruses. Human papillomavirus vaccine (Gardasil and Cervarix) decreases the risk of developing cervical cancer. The hepatitis B vaccine prevents infection with hepatitis B virus and thus decreases the risk of liver cancer. The administration of human papillomavirus and hepatitis B vaccinations is recommended when resources allow.

Some cancer vaccines are usually immunoglobulin-based and target antigens specific to cancer or abnormal human cells. These vaccines may be given to treat cancer during the progression of disease to boost the immune system's ability to recognize and attack cancer antigens as foreign entities. Antibodies for cancer cell vaccines may be taken from the patient's own body (autologous vaccine) or from another patient (allogeneic vaccine). Several autologous vaccines, such as Oncophage for kidney cancer and Vitespen for a variety of cancers, have either been released or are undergoing clinical trial. FDA-approved vaccines, such as Sipuleucel-T for metastasizing prostate cancer or Nivolumab for melanoma and lung cancer can act either by targeting over-expressed or mutated proteins or by temporarily inhibiting immune checkpoints to boost immune activity.

Screening 

Screening procedures, commonly sought for more prevalent cancers, such as colon, breast, and cervical, have greatly improved in the past few decades from advances in biomarker identification and detection. Early detection of pancreatic cancer biomarkers was accomplished using SERS-based immunoassay approach. A SERS-base multiplex proteinbiomarker detection platform in a microfluidic chip to detect is used to detect several protein biomarkers to
predict the type of disease and critical biomarkers and increase the chance of diagnosis between diseases with similar biomarkers (PC, OVC, and pancreatitis).

For detecting cancer early all eligible people need to go to screenings but disadvantaged groups face different barriers that lead to lower attendance rates.

Cervical cancer 
Cervical cancer is usually screened through in vitro examination of the cells of the cervix (e.g. Pap smear), colposcopy, or direct inspection of the cervix (after application of dilute acetic acid), or testing for HPV, the oncogenic virus that is the necessary cause of cervical cancer. Screening is recommended for women over 21 years, initially women between 21–29 years old are encouraged to receive Pap smear screens every three years, and those over 29 every five years. For women older than the age of 65 and with no history of cervical cancer or abnormality, and with an appropriate precedence of negative Pap test results may cease regular screening.

Still, adherence to recommended screening plans depends on age and may be linked to "educational level, culture, psychosocial issues, and marital status," further emphasizing the importance of addressing these challenges in regards to cancer screening.

Colorectal cancer 
Colorectal cancer is most often screened with the fecal occult blood test (FOBT). Variants of this test include guaiac-based FOBT (gFOBT), the fecal immunochemical test (FIT), and stool DNA (sDNA) testing. Further testing includes flexible sigmoidoscopy (FS), total colonoscopy (TC), or computed tomography (CT) scans if a TC is non-ideal. A recommended age at which to begin screening is 50 years. However, this is highly dependent on medical history and exposure to CRC risk factors. Effective screening has been shown to reduce CRC incidence by 33% and CRC morality by 43%.

Breast cancer 
The estimated number of new breast cancer cases in the US in 2018 is predicted to be more than 1.7 million, with more than six-hundred thousand deaths. Factors such as breast size, reduced physical activity, obesity and overweight status, infertility and never having had children, hormone replacement therapy (HRT), and genetics are risk factors for breast cancer. Mammograms are widely used to screen for breast cancer, and are recommended for women 50–74 years of age by the US Preventive Services Task Force (USPSTF). However, the USPSTF recommended against mammographies for women 40–49 years old due to possibility of overdiagnosis.

Preventable causes of cancer
As of 2017, tobacco use, diet and nutrition, physical activity, obesity/overweight status, infectious agents, and chemical and physical carcinogens have been reported to be the leading areas where cancer prevention can be practiced through enacting positive lifestyle changes, getting appropriate regular screening, and getting vaccinated.

The development of many common cancers are incited by such risk factors. For example, consumption of tobacco and alcohol, a medical history of genital warts and STDs, immunosuppression, unprotected sex, and early age of first sexual intercourse and pregnancy all may serve as risk factors for cervical cancer. Obesity, red meat or processed meat consumption, tobacco and alcohol, and a medical history of inflammatory bowel diseases are all risk factors for colorectal cancer (CRC). On the other hand, exercise and consumption of vegetables may help decrease the risk of CRC.

Several preventable causes of cancer were highlighted in Doll and Peto's landmark 1981 study, estimating that 75 – 80% of cancers in the United States could be prevented by avoidance of 11 different factors.  A 2013 review of more recent cancer prevention literature by Schottenfeld et al., summarizing studies reported between 2000 and 2010, points to most of the same avoidable factors identified by Doll and Peto. However, Schottenfeld et al. considered fewer factors (e.g. non inclusion of diet) in their review than Doll and Peto, and indicated that avoidance of these fewer factors would result in prevention of 60% of cancer deaths.  The table below indicates the proportions of cancer deaths attributed to different factors, summarizing the observations of Doll and Peto, Shottenfeld et al. and several other authors, and shows the influence of major lifestyle factors on the prevention of cancer, such as tobacco, an unhealthy diet, obesity and infections.

*Included in diet

†Carcinogenic infections include: for the uterine cervix (human papillomavirus [HPV]), liver (hepatitis B virus [HBV] and hepatitis C virus [HCV]), stomach (Helicobacter pylori [H pylori]), lymphoid tissues (Epstein-Barr virus [EBV]), nasopharynx (EBV), urinary bladder (Schistosoma hematobium), and biliary tract (Opisthorchis viverrini, Clonorchis sinensis)

History of cancer prevention 
Cancer has been thought to be a preventable disease since the time of Roman physician Galen, who observed that unhealthy diet was correlated with cancer incidence. In 1713, Italian physician Ramazzini hypothesized that abstinence caused lower rates of cervical cancer in nuns. Further observation in the 18th century led to the discovery that certain chemicals, such as tobacco, soot and tar (leading to scrotal cancer in chimney sweepers, as reported by Percivall Pot in 1775), could serve as carcinogens for humans. Although Potts suggested preventive measures for chimney sweeps (wearing clothes to prevent contact bodily contact with soot), his suggestions were only put into practice in Holland, resulting in decreasing rates of scrotal cancer in chimney sweeps. Later, the 19th century brought on the onset of the classification of chemical carcinogens.

In the early 20th century, physical and biological carcinogens, such as X ray radiation or the Rous Sarcoma Virus discovered 1911, were identified. Despite observed correlation of environmental or chemical factors with cancer development, there was a deficit of formal prevention research and lifestyle changes for cancer prevention were not feasible during this time.

In Europe, in 1987 the European Commission launched the European Code Against Cancer to help educate the public about actions they can take to reduce their risk of getting cancer. The first version of the Code covered 10 recommendations covering tobacco, alcohol, diet, weight, sun exposure, exposure to known carcinogens, early detection and participation in organised breast and cervical cancer screening programmes. In the early 1990s, the European School of Oncology led a review of the Code and added details about the scientific evidence behind each of the recommendations. Later updates were coordinated by the International Agency for Research on Cancer. The fourth edition of the Code, developed in 2012‒2013, also includes recommendations on participation in vaccination programmes for hepatitis B (infants) and human papillomavirus (girls), breast feeding and hormone replacement therapy, and participation in organised colorectal cancer screening programmes.

See also
BRCA1 and BRCA2 (genetic blood test to verify familiar predisposizione to cancer)
Microplastics ingested through diet
Human genetic enhancement
The Cancer Prevention and Treatment Fund
World Cancer Day

References

External links

Cancer prevention on the website of the National Cancer Institute 
Cancer prevention on the website of the World Health Organization

Prevention
Cancer